Dalian Sports Centre Stadium is a multi-purpose stadium in Dalian, Liaoning province, China. The stadium has a maximum capacity of 61,000. The stadium was built for the 2013 National Games of China, and switched to other purposes, mainly football, afterwards. Between 2014 and 2020, Dalian Professional F.C. were the tenants.

Design 
The Dalian Sports Centre Stadium consists of major stadium, arena, tennis pitch, baseball pitch, and swimming stadium. The baseball pitch was re-fitted to football training pitch after the National Games.

In 2020, Dalian Sports Centre started its renovation project, in order to meet the requirements for the 2021 FIFA Club World Cup. The stadium would be refitted to professional football pitch with the running track removed, but the project was halted later as China quit hosting the Club World Cup.

Notable Events

Sports 

 September 2013: Men's and women's under-18 football, tennis, gymnastics, artistic swimming of the 2013 National Games of China.
 2014–2020: Home stadium of Dalian Professional F.C. (formerly known as Dalian Aerbin and Dalian Yifang).
 2020: 2020 Chinese Super League group A and relegation stage, 2020 Chinese FA Cup first round.
 2021: 2021 China League One, 2021 Chinese FA Cup.
 2022: Temporary home stadium of Shanghai Port F.C. in the second stage of the 2022 Chinese Super League.

Concerts 

 Joker Xue - I Think I've Seen You Somewhere Tour - 22 April 2017

 JJ Lin - Sanctuary World Tour - 5 May 2018

 Jay Chou - The Invincible World Tour - 14 & 15 July 2018

References

Football venues in China
Multi-purpose stadiums in China
Sports venues in Liaoning
Sport in Dalian
Buildings and structures in Dalian
Sports venues completed in 2013
2013 establishments in China